A Kiss in the Dark is a 1949 comedy film directed by Delmer Daves, starring David Niven and Jane Wyman, and featuring Wayne Morris, Victor Moore, Broderick Crawford, and Maria Ouspenskaya (in her last film appearance). The plot revolves around a pianist who purchases, solely as a hands-off investment, an apartment house full of loony tenants.

Plot
Concert pianist Eric Phillips (David Niven) has been on the road touring for twenty-one years when he finally returns home. One day he is served a warrant to perform repairs on the building he owns, and learns that his financial advisor, Peter Danilo, bought the building with his money some time ago as an investment. Eric goes to visit the building and meets some of its tenants. Among them the young and beautiful photo model Polly Haines (Jane Wyman), and Eric is instantly smitten by her. While they speak Polly's suitor, an insurance salesman, Bruce Arnold (Wayne Morris), arrives to the building. Being afraid of damaging his piano hands, Eric is convinced to buy an insurance for himself before he starts the building repairs. Eric and the rest of the tenants agree to fix up the building together during the next few weeks. They start off by building a roof garden with a day care center, and while the rest of the tenants go at it, Eric takes the kids on a hike. When he returns from the hike, a building inspector tells him that the building repairs are insufficient. Eric blames the former owner and present manager, Horace Willoughby (Victor Moore), for the poor quality of the work, and fires him on the spot. Polly comes to Horace's defense, telling Eric that he is a helpful soul who was unfortunate and had to sell the building to manage. Filled with remorse, Eric rehires Horace as chief of the repairs.

Inevitably, Eric and Polly fall in love, much to Bruce's dismay, and he is beyond himself with jealousy. Eric takes advice from a musician friend, Madame Karina, and works less with his hands. Bruce somehow convinces Eric that Polly isn't really interested in him, and that she only led him on so that Bruce could sell him the insurance. Eric decides to go on a tour again, but before he has a chance to go, Horace locks him in with Polly in his apartment. They talk to each other and discover that both Bruce and Peter Danilo wanted Eric separated from Polly, for different selfish reasons. Eric then leaves on the tour with Polly, and it becomes their honeymoon trip.

Cast
 David Niven as Eric Phillips
 Jane Wyman as Polly Haines
 Victor Moore as Horace Willoughby
 Wayne Morris as Bruce Arnold
 Broderick Crawford as Mr. Botts
 Joseph Buloff as Peter Danilo
 Maria Ouspenskaya as Madame Karina
 Curt Bois as Hugo Schloss
 Percival Vivian as Benton
 Raymond Greenleaf as Martin Soames
 John Alvin as Tenant (uncredited)
 Phyllis Coates as Mrs. Hale (uncredited)
 Frank Dae as Hiram Knabe (uncredited)
 Joe Devlin as Stage Electrician (uncredited)
 Jimmie Dodd as Studsy Nolan (uncredited)
 Franklyn Farnum as Tenant (uncredited)
 Creighton Hale as Tenant (uncredited)
 Grayce Hampton as Mrs. Stuyvedant (uncredited)
 Stuart Holmes as Stage Manager (uncredited)
 Douglas Kennedy as Radio Concert Broadcaster (voice) (uncredited)
 Frank Marlowe as Taxi Driver (uncredited)
 Ray Montgomery as Chet Hale (uncredited)
 Jack Mower as Chris the Chauffeur (uncredited)
 Paul Panzer as Tenant (uncredited)
 Sailor Vincent as Schloss's Assistant (uncredited)
 Tom Wilson as Tenant (uncredited)

References

External links
 
 
 
 

1949 comedy films
1949 films
American black-and-white films
American comedy films
1940s English-language films
Films directed by Delmer Daves
Films with screenplays by Harry Kurnitz
Warner Bros. films
1940s American films